Charlemagne is a 1933 French comedy drama film directed by Pierre Colombier and starring Raimu, Léon Belières and Marie Glory. A group of upper-class passengers on a ship are saved by a stoker who takes them to an island, where he soon rises to be their monarch. The film is based on the 1902 play The Admirable Crichton by J. M. Barrie.

Cast
 Raimu - le matelot Charlemagne
 Marie Glory - Rose Val
 Léon Bélières - le docteur
 Jean Dax - le baron
 Gaston Jacquet - le directeur
 Lucien Baroux - l'auteur
 Christian-Gérard - Bardac
 Auguste Mouriès - le capitaine
 Pierre Piérade - Malet

References

External links

Credits

1933 films
French comedy-drama films
1930s French-language films
Films based on works by J. M. Barrie
Films directed by Pierre Colombier
French black-and-white films
Films about survivors of seafaring accidents or incidents
Films set on uninhabited islands
French films based on plays
1933 comedy-drama films
1930s French films